Michael Gill (22 September 1899 – 21 September 1980) was an Irish hurler who played as a right wing-back for the Galway and Dublin senior teams from 1922 until 1938.

Gill made his first championship appearance during the 1922 championship and became a regular player for both Galway and Dublin over the next sixteen years. During that time he won three All-Ireland winner's medals, four Leinster winner's medals and two National Hurling League winners' medals.

At club level Gill enjoyed lengthy playing careers with the Ballinderreen and Garda clubs, winning six county club championship winners' medals with the latter.

Biography
Gill was born in Ballinderreen, County Galway in 1899.  It was an area that had a very strong hurling tradition even prior to the establishment of the GAA in 1884.  In his youth Gill displayed a natural talent for the game.

Following his education Gill trained as a member of the Garda Síochána and served with the force until his retirement in 1962.  In 1929 he contemplated leaving the Gardaí and emigrating to the United States, however, the Wall Street Crash and the subsequent depression ended this plan.

Mick Gill died on 21 September 1980, just one day short of his 81st birthday and just two weeks after the Galway hurlers bridged a 57-year gap to capture their second All-Ireland title.

Playing career

Club
At 18 years of age Gill played junior hurling with his local Ballinderreen club before progressing onto their senior team a little while later.  He never won a senior county title with the club.

In Dublin Gill played his club hurling with the Garda GAA club and enjoyed much success.  He won senior county titles with the club in 1925, 1926, 1927, 1928, 1929 and 1931.

Inter-county
Gill first came to prominence on the inter-county scene as a member of the Galway senior hurling team in 1922.  That year he made his championship debut at right wing-back in the All-Ireland semi-final against Tipperary.  The game itself wasn’t played until 26 August 1923 and Gill ended up on the losing side that day.  His next outing with Galway was in the 1923 All-Ireland semi-final against the reigning champions Kilkenny.  Once again the game was delayed and wasn’t played until 18 May 1924, however, this time Gill's team beat the champions against all the odds.  Galway were later awarded the All-Ireland title as Limerick refused to play until all Civil War prisoners were released and were initially disqualified.  The game was eventually played on 14 September 1924. Gill made a huge contribution at midfield and his ploy of lobbing the ball into the square resulted in a 7-3 to 4-5 victory for Galway. Gill was one of the most effective members of the team and richly deserved his All-Ireland medal.

Prior to that year's All-Ireland semi-final Gill had become a member of the newly established Garda Síochána.  He was based in Dublin and, as such, played hurling with the Dublin senior inter-county team as well.  He won a Leinster title with the side in the 1924 championship before later finding himself in another All-Ireland final following a win over Antrim.  The 1924 All-Ireland final was played on 14 December of that year and Gill's opponents were his own native Galway.  ‘The Dubs’ won the game on a score line of 5-3 to 2-6.  Three months after winning his first All-Ireland medal Gill won his second and went into the history books as the only player ever to win two senior All-Ireland hurling medals in the same year.

In 1925 Gill won a second Leinster medal with Dublin, however, the team was later stripped of the title.  In 1926 he still played hurling with Dublin but the side made an early exit from the championship.  In 1927 Gill was appointed captain of Dublin and the team was back on form.  Gill captured a third Leinster title before later lining out in the championship decider against Cork who were aiming to capture a second consecutive All-Ireland title. Gill was assisted on the team by eight colleagues from the Gardaí.  Dublin won the game by 4-8 to 1-3 and Gill captured his third All-Ireland title.  In doing so he became the first native of Galway to win three senior All-Ireland hurling medals as well as becoming the second Galway native to lift the Liam MacCarthy Cup.  In 1928 Gill played hurling in the Tailteann Games, the Irish answer to the Olympic Games, before later collecting another Leinster title.  Two years later in 1930 Gill captured his fourth Leinster medal before lining out in the championship decider.  Tipperary, however, were too powerful for ‘the Dubs’ who lost the game by 2-7 to 1-3.  Gill retired from inter-county hurling shortly after.

Provincial
Gill also lined out in the inter-provincial competition with his adopted province of Leinster.  He won his sole Railway Cup medal in 1927, the inaugural year of the competition.

References

External links
 Ballinderreen Hurling Club

1899 births
1980 deaths
Garda Síochána officers
Ballinderreen hurlers
Garda hurlers
Galway inter-county hurlers
Dublin inter-county hurlers
Leinster inter-provincial hurlers
Connacht inter-provincial hurlers
All-Ireland Senior Hurling Championship winners